A city centre is the commercial, cultural and often the historical, political, and geographic heart of a city.

City Center may also refer to:

 Central business district
 Downtown

Canada
Edmonton City Centre, Edmonton, Alberta
Bramalea City Centre, Bramalea, Ontario
Islington-City Centre West, Toronto, Ontario
Scarborough City Centre, Toronto, Ontario

India
City Centre, Mangalore, Karnataka, India
City Centre Mall, Shimoga, Karnataka, India
City Centre Mall, Sambalpur, Odisha, India

Iran
 Isfahan City Center

United States

Oakland City Center, Oakland, California
City Center (Miami Beach), Florida
Brickell City Centre, Downtown Miami, Florida
Minneapolis City Center, Minneapolis, Minnesota
CityCenter, Paradise, Nevada
City Center at White Plains, White Plains, New York
New York City Center, a performing arts venue, New York City
City Center Mall, Grand Forks, North Dakota, United States
Columbus City Center, Columbus, Ohio
CityCentre, Houston, Texas
City Center station (UTA), Salt Lake City, Utah
City Center at Oyster Point, Newport News, Virginia
City Center District, Dallas, Texas
CityCenterDC, Washington, D.C.

Elsewhere

City Centre Bahrain, Bahrain
City Centre (ward), a ward of Manchester, England
City-Center, a 1960s redevelopment plan for Helsinki, Finland
City Centre Deira, Dubai, United Arab Emirates

See also 

 Central city, or core city
 Center City (disambiguation)
 Centre City (disambiguation)
 Citi Centre (disambiguation)
 
 
 
 
 Centre (disambiguation) including center
 City (disambiguation)